Metal is guitarist Preston Reed's first recording for Dusty Closet Records. It was re-released in 2002 on his own label, Outer Bridge Records (OB1002). The re-release includes a different version of the title track.

Reception

Music critic Robert Taylor of AllMusic praised the album, writing that Reed "never sounds mechanical. Rather, Reed creates memorable melodies with shifting percussive patterns that give the selections an organized, but relaxed feel... Required listening for guitarists of any style, or fans of beautiful acoustic."

Track listing
(All songs by Preston Reed) The track listing is in the order used on the re-release.
 "Blasting Cap" – 3:46
 "Stonecutter" – 3:24
 "Far Horizon" – 3:14
 "Slap Funk" – 2:35
 "Overture (for Lily)" – 4:49
 "Border Towns" – 3:33
 "Metal" – 3:36
 "Franzl's Saw" – 4:46
 "Fat Boy" – 2:53
 "Flatonia" – 3:33
 "Chattanooga" – 4:32
 "Tribes" – 3:51
 "Train" – 4:22

Personnel
Preston Reed – guitar, 12-string guitar, National Duolian metal-body guitar

Production notes
Produced by Preston Reed
Engineered by Paul Baron
Re-mixed and re-mastered by Paul Baron

References

1995 albums
Preston Reed albums